The Reverend Robert Lester Mondale (May 28, 1904 – August 19, 2003) was an American Unitarian minister and Humanist.

Biography 
Mondale was born in Walnut Grove, Minnesota, the son of Methodist minister and World War I hero Theodore Sigvaard Mondale and Jessie Alice Larson. Although his family was Methodist, he converted to Unitarianism while earning his B.A. from Hamline University. In 1926 Mondale entered the Unitarian ministry and in 1929 he earned an S.T.B. from Harvard Divinity School. He was ordained by the New North Unitarian Church, Hingham, Massachusetts, and went on to serve congregations in Evanston, Illinois, Kansas City, Missouri; Birmingham, Michigan; White Plains, New York; Tempe, Arizona; and Quincy, Illinois. His younger half-brother was Walter Mondale, Vice-President of the United States under Jimmy Carter.

He was married three times. From his first wife, Edith Eldred Klose (1904-1987) he had one daughter, Tarand Elose Mondale Swenstad (1931-2007). From his second wife, Fay A. Smead (1907-1976), he had three daughters: Ellen Smead Mondale (1943-2019), Karen Smead Mondale and Julia Smead Kellum Mondale Jensen. He married his third wife, Rosemary Delap (July 14, 1917-February 28, 2022) on May 31, 1961. He was survived by his third and last wife.

Selected publications 

The Missouri still runs wild, Westport Pub. Co. (Kansas City, MO) 1943 
Three Unitarian philosophies of religion, Beacon Press (Boston) 1946 
The Unitarian way of life,  Beacon Press (Boston) 1943 
Values in world religions, Starr King Press 1958 
Preachers in Purgatory With Reference to Accounts of More Than a Hundred Ministers Reporting on Crisis Situations, Beacon Press 1966
New Man of Religious Humanism, Volturna Press 1973

References

External links
 Press release announcing his death
 The Human Infinite by Mondale
 Beyond the Ten Commandments by Mondale.

1904 births
2003 deaths
People from Walnut Grove, Minnesota
American humanists
American Unitarian Universalists
Hamline University alumni
Harvard Divinity School alumni
Walter Mondale
Writers from Minnesota
Former Methodists